Nuth Rumdoul is a Cambodian politician. He belongs to the Sam Rainsy Party and was elected to represent Kampong Speu Province in the National Assembly of Cambodia in 2003.

References

Members of the National Assembly (Cambodia)
Candlelight Party politicians
Cambodia National Rescue Party politicians
Living people
1946 births
People from Svay Rieng province